Vladimiro Roca Antúnez (born 21 December 1942) is a Cuban dissident and leader of the illegal Cuban Social-Democratic Party. A member of the "Group of Four", he was imprisoned from 1997 to 2002 after co-authoring a paper calling for democratic reforms.

Early life
Roca is the son of Blas Roca Calderio, one of the founders of the Communist Party of Cuba. He was born in Havana. In 1961, at the age of 18, he was among the first batch of a young elite selected for training as fighter pilots in the Soviet Union. He served for ten years in the Cuban Armed Forces, and subsequently worked as an economist for the government. He became an active dissident in 1991, four years after his father's death. Roca and his father were close, though the son never had the same enthusiasm for Fidel Castro's 1959 socialist revolution. He was then fired from his state job.

The Group of Four 
In August 1996, he linked up with three other Cuban professionals who favored change, economist Marta Beatriz Roque, engineer Félix Bonne Carcassés and attorney René Gómez Manzano to form the Working Group for Internal Dissidence. They then published a paper titled "The Homeland Belongs to All," which discussed Cuba's human rights situation and called for political and economic reforms. They also called for a boycott of elections in Cuba's one-party system and for investors to avoid Cuba, giving several news conferences to discuss their concerns. A The Los Angeles Times columnist described Roca and Bonne's criticism carrying extra weight as "the only known black dissidents in Cuba", stating that "Given Castro's claim that the revolution has ended racial discrimination, he can ill afford to let well-educated blacks challenge him, even as gently as the four defendants had done."

Roca and the other members of the group were arrested on 16 July 1997. The four were detained for nineteen months and then tried for sedition in March 1999 in a one-day trial closed to foreign press. Roca was sentenced to five years' imprisonment. The defendants became known as the "Group of Four". The US, EU, Canada, and the Vatican all called for his release. Amnesty International declared the four prisoners of conscience, "detained solely for peacefully exercising their rights to freedom of expression and association", and called for their immediate release.

Roque, Bonne and Gómez were released in May 2000, but Roca was held for an additional two years. The Human Rights Committee of the US National Academy of Sciences speculated that he was "singled out for particularly severe treatment because he had been a member of the Cuban Communist Party and his father had been one of its founding members".

Roca entered prison an atheist, but was baptised Roman Catholic on 24 September 1999. He credited his new faith with helping him endure imprisonment. He was released from prison on 6 May 2002, 70 days before his five-year-sentence would have expired. CNN described the early release as "apparently a conciliatory gesture" by Castro ahead of a visit by former US president Jimmy Carter. Roca told reporters, "I plan to continue working like I was before being arrested ... to continue the struggle because I believe I will see a change in Cuba before too long." Roca met with Carter a week after his release.

Later activism 
In March 2003, Roca, Roque, and Elizardo Sanchez lobbied the European Union not to sign a trade agreement with Cuba. Roca stated that "we do not believe a country with such a black human rights record should be allowed to join". Roca also criticized the EU's 2008 lifting of sanctions against Cuba, accusing leaders of pushing the measure through against the popular will.

In May 2005, Roca and Roque organized a meeting of 200 dissidents which, unusually, was not interrupted by police. Roque described it as "the first such gathering in Fidel Castro's 46 years of communist rule" and "a point of departure" for further discussion.

Recognition 
In 2002, he won the Civil Courage Prize, which recognizes "steadfast resistance to evil at great personal risk — rather than military valor."

Family 
He is married to Magaly de Armas, and they have a son and a daughter.

See also 

 Cuban dissident movement

References

1942 births
Living people
People from Havana
Converts to Roman Catholicism from atheism or agnosticism
Cuban Roman Catholics
Cuban dissidents
Cuban human rights activists
Cuban prisoners and detainees
Amnesty International prisoners of conscience held by Cuba